Mary Ellen Jones may refer to:

 Mary Ellen Jones (politician) (born 1936), educator and politician in New York State
 Mary Ellen Jones (chemist) (1922–1996), American biochemist
Mary Ellen Jones (1817–1865), wife of Robertson Gladstone

See also 
 Mary Jones (disambiguation)
 Ellen Jones (disambiguation)